The FuMO 24 and 25 ( (Radio-direction finder, active ranging)) were designed as a replacement for the earlier FuMO search radar for Nazi Germany's Kriegsmarine in 1943. The differences between the two models are not clear and it usually used a larger  antenna than the older system.

Notes

Citations

Bibliography

 

World War II German radars
Naval radars
Military equipment introduced from 1940 to 1944